The 2017 British Speedway Championship was the 57th edition of the British Speedway Championship. Danny King was the defending champion having won the title in 2016. The competition consisted of two semi-finals and a final, with eight riders qualifying from each semi-final. The final took place at the National Speedway Stadium in Belle Vue, Manchester on 19 June 2017 and was won by Craig Cook. It was Cook's first national title, having finished second in the three previous years. He dominated the final, scoring 14 points, before beating Steve Worrall, Ben Barker and Australian Rory Schlein in the deciding race. Schlein was competing in the event on a British racing licence.

Results

Semi-Final 1 
  Newcastle
 30 April 2017

Semi-Final 2 
  Sheffield
 4 May 2017

The Final 
  National Speedway Stadium, Manchester
 19 June 2017

See also 
 British Speedway Championship

References 

British Speedway Championship
Great Britain